String of Hits is the twelfth studio album by British instrumental (and sometimes vocal) rock group The Shadows, released in 1979 through EMI.

Background
The album was an attempt to cover recent hit singles in the Shadows' trademark instrumental style, along with rounding up some of their recent hit singles onto an LP, including the top 5 cover of "Don't Cry for Me Argentina". The arrangements were selected by Hank Marvin.

Reception
The album reached No. 1 in the British albums chart and staying on top for a total of six weeks. It was certified Platinum on 25 January 1980.

Track listing

Personnel
Hank Marvin - Lead guitar
Bruce Welch - Rhythm guitar
Brian Bennett - Drums and percussion
With
Alan Jones - Bass guitar 
Dave Lawson- Synthesizers
Alan Hawkshaw - Piano on "Bridge Over Troubled Water" and "You're The One That I Want"

Peter Vince - Engineer
Stefan Heller - Assistant Engineer
Artwork and Design – Cream
Steve Gray - Orchestral accompaniment on "Classical Gas", "Bridge Over Troubled Water" and "Rodrigo's Guitar Concerto De Aranjuez"
Recorded at EMI, Abbey Road Studios, London and The Music Centre, Wembley

Charts

Certifications

References 

1979 albums
EMI Records albums
The Shadows albums